In actuarial science, force of mortality represents the instantaneous rate of mortality at a certain age measured on an annualized basis. It is identical in concept to failure rate, also called hazard function, in reliability theory.

Motivation and definition

In a life table, we consider the probability of a person dying from age x to x + 1, called qx. In the continuous case, we could also consider the conditional probability of a person who has attained age (x) dying between ages x and x + Δx, which is

where FX(x) is the cumulative distribution function of the continuous age-at-death random variable, X. As Δx tends to zero, so does this probability in the continuous case. The approximate force of mortality is this probability divided by Δx. If we let Δx tend to zero, we get the function for force of mortality, denoted by :

Since fX(x)=F 'X(x) is the probability density function of X, and S(x) = 1 - FX(x) is the survival function, the force of mortality can also be expressed variously as:

To understand conceptually how the force of mortality operates within a population, consider that the ages, x, where the probability density function fX(x) is zero, there is no chance of dying. Thus the force of mortality at these ages is zero. The force of mortality μ(x) uniquely defines a probability density function fX(x).

The force of mortality  can be interpreted as the conditional density of failure at age x, while f(x) is the unconditional density of failure at age x. The unconditional density of failure at age x is the product of the probability of survival to age x, and the conditional density of failure at age x, given survival to age x.

This is expressed in symbols as

or equivalently

In many instances, it is also desirable to determine the survival probability function when the force of mortality is known. To do this, integrate the force of mortality over the interval x to x + t

.

By the fundamental theorem of calculus, this is simply

Let us denote 

then taking the exponent to the base e, the survival probability of an individual of age x in terms of the force of mortality is

Examples
 The simplest example is when the force of mortality is constant:

then the survival function is 

is the exponential distribution.

 When the force of mortality is 

where γ(α,y) is the lower incomplete gamma function, the probability density function that of Gamma distribution

 When the force of mortality is 

where α ≥ 0, we have 

Thus, the survival function is 

where  This is the survival function for Weibull distribution. For α = 1, it is same as the exponential distribution.

 Another famous example is when the survival model follows Gompertz–Makeham law of mortality. In this case, the force of mortality is

Using the last formula, we have

Then

where

See also 
 Failure rate
 Hazard function
 Actuarial present value
 Actuarial science
 Reliability theory
 Life expectancy

References 

Actuarial science
Demography